Khukhragarh was one of the capitals of Nagvanshi dynasty, who once ruled in parts of the Indian state of Jharkhand. It is located in the Bero block in the Ranchi Sadar subdivision of Ranchi district.

Geography

History
Nagvanshi ruler Bhim Karn shifted his capital to Khukhragarh in the 12th century after defeating Raksel of Surguja. In 1585, during the reign of Madhu Singh, the Mughals invaded under Akbar's general Shahbaz Khan Kamboh. It is said that king Durjan Shah shifted his capital from Khukhragarh to Navratangarh.

Archaeology
In 2009, the archaeological department has  excavated the remains of the Nagvanshi dynasty's fort dating back to 12th century AD. Archaeologists have  found an ancient temple complex, coins and pottery.

References

Jharkhand
Ranchi
Forts in Jharkhand
History of Jharkhand